State Route 55 (SR 55) is a  state highway in the southern part of the U.S. state of Alabama. The southern terminus of the highway is at the Florida state line, where the highway continues as Florida State Road 85 (SR 85). The northern terminus of the highway is at an intersection with SR 106 at Georgiana in southern Butler County.

Route description
SR 55 is a continuation of a route heading northward from Fort Walton Beach and Crestview, Florida. It enters the state at the border town of Florala, where it continues as Florida State Road 85. As the highway heads towards Andalusia, it travels through the Conecuh National Forest.

The highway intersects US 29/US 84 at Andalusia, forming a brief wrong-way concurrency, as southbound US 29 shares the same roadway as northbound SR 55, as well as westbound US 84. SR 55 and US 84 are concurrent as they lead northwesterly from Andalusia. At the small community of River Falls, SR 55 splits from US 84 and heads northward towards McKenzie, where it joins with US 31. Just south of Georgiana, US 31 splits from the route which continues to its terminus at SR 106, which connects with Interstate 65 (I-65).

The route is now a four-lane highway from its intersection with US 29 just south of Andalusia northward to its terminus with SR 106 and Interstate 65 near Georgiana.

This highway is increasing in popularity with travelers headed to the Fort Walton/Destin area.

History

From its creation in 1928, S.R. 55 has been extremely important to the infrastructure of Alabama. From 1934 to 1955, its routing from McKenzie to Andalusia was also a portion of U.S. Route 84. U.S. 84 was rerouted onto a shorter, much more direct route from Evergreen to Andalusia in 1955.

In 1978, S.R. 55 was rerouted onto a new, much less curvy highway from McKenzie to Andalusia, bypassing Red Level - this new routing was a four-lane highway. 
In the mid-2000s, a bypass of Georgiana - home to its junction with SR-106 - was constructed. This new routing would junction with SR-106 west of Georgiana, continuing west to its junction with Interstate 65 - its present-day junction with the Interstate.

On the other hand, its routing south of Andalusia has remained relatively unchanged, with the only major change to the routing being the addition of a bypass of downtown Andalusia in 1995 - thus making SR-55 through Andalusia a Truck-and-Business route complex.

Major intersections

See also

 List of highways numbered 55

References

External links

055
Transportation in Covington County, Alabama
Transportation in Conecuh County, Alabama
Transportation in Butler County, Alabama